Mahipetsinhji (born July 1930) is an Indian former cricketer. He played first-class cricket for Delhi and Services between 1947 and 1960.

See also
 List of Delhi cricketers

References

External links
 

1930 births
Living people
Indian cricketers
Delhi cricketers
Services cricketers
Place of birth missing (living people)